Lev Abramovich Tumarkin (14 January 1904 – 1 August 1974) was a Russian mathematician. He was dean of the Faculty of Mechanics and Mathematics of Moscow State University.

He was a student of Pavel Aleksandrov.

He attended the First International Topological Conference in Moscow, 1935 as a host but made no presentation.

References

1904 births
1974 deaths
20th-century Russian mathematicians